Protein cappuccino homolog is a protein that in humans is encoded by the CNO gene.

This intronless gene encodes a protein that may play a role in organelle biogenesis associated with melanosomes, platelet dense granules, and lysosomes. A similar protein in mouse is a component of a protein complex termed biogenesis of lysosome-related organelles complex 1 (BLOC-1), and is a model for Hermansky–Pudlak syndrome. The encoded protein may play a role in intracellular vesicular trafficking.

Interactions
CNO (gene) has been shown to interact with BLOC1S2 and PLDN.

References

External links

Further reading